The Lake Edouard, Quebec is a lake in Canada, in province of Quebec, in the municipality of Lac-Edouard in the administrative region of Mauricie. The entire area of this lake is located in the municipality of Lac-Edouard.

Geography

This lake is the head of the valley of the Batiscanie, Quebec. This lake has the distinction of having two emissaries: Batiscan River and Jeannotte River. The main tributary of the lake is the Rats River whose headwater lake is Rats Lake; the river flows north-east before turning south to empty into the Rats Bay, located in the western part of the lake. The lake has several other bays, such as Power, the Bouquet, Great Bay, Steamboat, Round and Gull Rock.

Lake Edward has several islands including the three largest that are located southwest of Lake: Hoffman Island, the island Turner and Ziegfeld.

Ecological Reserve Judith de Brésoles is situated on the east side of the lake, around the "Lac Mauvais" (lake Wrong). The Zec Besonne is located in the southern part of the lake, close to the Zec Jeannotte.

The village of Lac-Edouard, Quebec is located in the northeast of the lake, near the mouth that flows into a series of lake forming head to the Batiscan.

Toponymy

Its name is in use since 1828 by the surveyor Joseph Bouchette and would come from Edward Jeannotte, a trapper living in Batiscan, a parish at the mouth of Batiscan River. The lake's name is also attested in Montagnais language as "Etoolsakigan", which also means "Lac Edouard".

History

The forestry industry was very important around Lac Edouard, since the arrival of the train in the 1890. The loggers were active on the lake to transport timber to the sawmill with pulling boats with cables surrounding floating logs. In 1901, a terrible forest fire destroy the forest around the lake and forced the lay-off for 1000 workers of the Lac-Edouard sawmill.

See also 

 Lac-Edouard, Quebec, municipality
 Batiscanie
 Batiscan River
 La Tuque

Sources 
 Lake Edward - Directory of Quebec Municipalities
 Commission de toponymie du Québec (Geographical Names Board of Québec

References 

Lakes of Mauricie
Landforms of La Tuque, Quebec